College Corner is an unincorporated community in Wayne Township, Jay County, Indiana.

History
College Corner was founded in 1850, and named from the presence of Farmers Academy. College Corner contained a post office from 1862 until 1872.

Geography

References

Unincorporated communities in Jay County, Indiana
Unincorporated communities in Indiana
1850 establishments in Indiana